Oceania Paralympic Committee (acronym: OPC) is an organisation based in Sydney, Australia. It is an international organization that congregates the 9 National Paralympic Committees (NPCs) of Oceania.

History

The Oceania Paralympic Committee was formed in 2006 when the FESPIC Federation was divided into two separate bodies, the Oceania Paralympic Committee and the Asian Paralympic Committee (APC).

Member countries 
In the following table, the year in which the NPC was recognised by the International Paralympic Committee (IPC) is also given if it is different from the year in which the NPC was created.

See also
 Oceania National Olympic Committees

References

External links
 Official website

Paralympic Committees
Sports organisations of Australia
2006 establishments in Oceania
Sports organizations established in 2006